Pavel Tabakov may refer to:

 Pavlo Tabakov (born 1978), Ukrainian musician and singer
 Pavel Tabakov (footballer) (born 1970), Russian football player